Maximalists may refer to several political movements and parties including:

 The Bolsheviks
 The Union of Socialists Revolutionaries Maximalists